Trochida is an order of small to very large vetigastropod, Recent and extinct sea snails with gills and an operculum.

Taxonomy
Still existing trochomorphs stem from a large, archaic clade. According to Uribe et al. (2016) the superfamilies Angarioidea and Phasianelloidea are deeply nested within the superfamily Trochoidea sensu Williams (2012). The revised taxonomy (2017) of Bouchet et al. therefore only recognizes the superfamily Trochoidea (including Angarioidea and Phasianelloidea).

Superfamilies
 Trochoidea Rafinesque, 1815
Synonyms
 Angarioidea Gray, 1857: synonym of Trochoidea Rafinesque, 1815
 Phasianelloidea Swainson, 1840: synonym of Trochoidea Rafinesque, 1815

References

 Bouchet P., Rocroi J.P., Hausdorf B., Kaim A., Kano Y., Nützel A., Parkhaev P., Schrödl M. & Strong E.E. (2017). Revised classification, nomenclator and typification of gastropod and monoplacophoran families. Malacologia. 61(1-2): 1-526

Vetigastropoda